Big Shark is an upcoming horror drama film directed and produced by Tommy Wiseau. It was written by and stars Wiseau, Greg Sestero, and Isaiah LaBorde.

The film is set to release in August 2023, in New York City.

Premise 
Three firefighters, Georgie (Greg Sestero), Tim (Isaiah LaBorde), and Patrick (Tommy Wiseau), must save New Orleans from a killer shark.

Cast 
 Greg Sestero as Georgie
 Isaiah LaBorde as Tim
 Tommy Wiseau as Patrick
 Hannah Mouton

Production

Filming 
Principal photography began on February 7, 2019, in Lafayette, Louisiana, with Matt S. Bell serving as cinematographer. Filming concluded in Lafayette two weeks later, on February 21, 2019. On November 16, 2021, Wiseau announced filming was ongoing in New Orleans, Louisiana. On July 28, 2022, Wiseau said filming was "in progress and working towards completion". The film was set to shoot in London, England.

Release 

Big Shark is set to release in August 2023 in New York City. The film was scheduled to have its world premiere at the Prince Charles Cinema in September 2019, but was delayed. On July 21, 2020, Wiseau said that the film will be released "soon", before scheduling its release for 2021. On November 8, 2021, the film was set for a theatrical release in 2022.

References

External links 
 

2020s English-language films
2023 films
2023 horror films
2023 independent films
American drama films
American independent films
American natural horror films
Upcoming English-language films
Films about shark attacks
Films set in New Orleans
Films shot in Louisiana
Upcoming films